Glacier Pass is a mountain pass on northern Ellesmere Island, Nunavut, Canada. It is located in Quttinirpaaq National Park on the northeastern corner of Ellesmere Island.

References 

Arctic Cordillera
Mountain passes of Qikiqtaaluk Region
Ellesmere Island